The 3rd Standing Committee of the Supreme People's Assembly (SPA) was elected by the 1st Session of the 3rd Supreme People's Assembly on 23 October 1962. It was replaced on 16 December 1967 by the 4th SPA Standing Committee.

Members

Replacements

References

Citations

Bibliography
Books:
 

3rd Supreme People's Assembly
Presidium of the Supreme People's Assembly
1962 establishments in North Korea
1967 disestablishments in North Korea